Rokhl is a Jewsih feminine given name, a form of Rachel, a transcription of Yiddish "Rochl". 

Matronymic surnames Rokhlin (variants: Rochlin, Rohlin, Rockline) are derived from it.

Notable people known by the name include:

Rokhl Auerbakh
Ester-Rokhl Kaminska
Rokhl Häring Korn
Rokhl Brokhes

See also